Stenaroa rubriflava is a moth of the subfamily Lymantriinae first described by Paul Griveaud in 1973. It is found in eastern Madagascar.

The male of this species has a wingspan of 18–24 mm.

The holotype of this species had been found north-eastern Madagascar 50 km west of Andapa at elevation of 1600 m.

References

Lymantriinae
Moths described in 1973
Moths of Madagascar
Moths of Africa